Reno is a 1930 American pre-Code drama film directed by George J. Crone and starring silent serial queen Ruth Roland. It was produced and distributed by early sound era production studio Sono Art-World Wide Pictures. Roland's sound film debut, she would follow up with only one more talkie.

Cast
Ruth Roland as  Felecia Brett
Montague Love as Alexander W. Brett
Kenneth Thomson as Richard Belden
Sam Hardy as J. B. Berkley
Alyce McCormick as Ann Hodge
Edward Hearn as Tom Hodge
Doris Lloyd as Lola Fealey
Judith Vosselli as Rita Rogers
Virginia Ainsworth as Marie
Beulah Monroe as Mrs. Martin
Douglas Scott as Bobby Brett
Emmett King as Judge Cooper
Henry Hall as Prosecuting Attorney
Gayne Whitman as Defending Attorney

References

External links

1930 films
American drama films
1930 drama films
American black-and-white films
1930s English-language films
1930s American films